Children of Time may refer to:

Children of Time (novel), a 2015 novel by Adrian Tchaikovsky
"Children of Time" (Star Trek: Deep Space Nine), an episode of the television series